John Judge could refer to: 

John Judge (trade unionist) (died 1916), British trade unionist
John "Jack" Judge (1872–1938), British musician and songwriter
John Judge (politician) (born 1944), American politician from Iowa

See also
Jonathan Judge, American television producer and director